The Promavia F.1300 Jet Squalus, also known as Promavia Jet Squalus F1300, was a two-seat light jet trainer designed by Italian Stelio Frati and built by Promavia in Belgium with support from the Belgian government.

Development
The Jet Squalus was designed by Frati and based on his earlier lightweight jet trainers the F.5 Trento and the F.400 Cobra. It was a low-wing cantilever monoplane with retractable landing gear. The Jet Squalus was powered by a Garrett TFE109 turbofan with engine intakes in above the wing root. The prototype, registered I-SQAL, first flew on 30 April 1987. The aircraft was fitted with four underwing hard points for disposable stores to allow weapons training.

Operational history

With the demise of the similar American Fairchild T-46 trainer in 1986 the support for the engine disappeared and it was planned to re-engine with the Williams-Rolls FJ44. The aircraft was exhibited at the Farnborough Air Show in September 1988, but the project folded and Promavia went bankrupt in 1998. An unflown second prototype was to be modified for airline pilot training, and the unfinished third prototype was to be pressurised.

Variants
F1300 NGTThe baseline jet trainer version of the Procaer Cobra lineage. 
F1300 AWS-MS/SARProposed Maritime surveillance/search and rescue.
F1300 AWS-R Proposed Reconnaissance.
F1300 AWS-W Proposed Armament trainer or Police/Border defence.
F1300 AWS-TTProposed Target tower.

Specifications

See also

References

 
 

 

1980s Belgian military trainer aircraft
Low-wing aircraft
Single-engined jet aircraft
Aircraft first flown in 1987